Piquet GP, formerly known as Minardi Piquet Sports or Minardi by Piquet Sports and Piquet Sports, is a motor racing team. The team's history can be traced back to when the GP Racing team was founded in 1997, and also to when Piquet Sports was created in 2000 by triple world champion Nelson Piquet. In 2007, Piquet Sports and GP Racing merged to create "Minardi Piquet Sports". In 2008, the team dropped "Minardi" from their name. In early 2009, the team was sold and rebranded as Piquet GP, but changed its name again in November to Rapax Team, once all remaining ties to part-owner Piquet were cut.

History

GP Racing
GP Racing was founded in 1997 by Tancredi Pagiaro to compete in the Italian Formula Three Championship. The team then debuted in the FIA International Formula 3000 championship in 1998 with French driver, Cyrille Sauvage, only managing two points. In 1999 they expanded to two cars with Italian, Fabrizio Gollin in one car and Giovanni Montanari, Gastón Mazzacane and Laurent Delahaye sharing the second. However none of the drivers managed to score points

Towards the end of 1999, GP Racing entered the Italian F3000 with just a single car driven by Thomas Biagi. Despite only competing in the last 3 races, Biagi scored enough points to end the season 4th in points. In 2000, Swiss driver Gabriele Gardel joined the team in a second car alongside Biagi. It was a somewhat disappointing season with Biagi only ending the season 5th with Gardel failing to score. GP Racing came 6th in the teams championship. Both Biagi and Gardel continued with the team in 2001. Biagi had a much better season taking the GP Racing's first win at Donington Park on his way to 2nd in the championship.  Gardel came 9th overall while the team came 2nd in the teams championship. 2002 was once again a peak season: GP Racing came 4th out of the 14 teams that participated on the constructor’s classification with Alessandro Piccolo and Martin Basso. In 2003 for the third consecutive year, GP Racing competed in Euro 3000 Series Championship with promising young talents behind the wheel: Italian Fabrizio Del Monte, Russian Roman Rusinov and young Belgian Maxime Hodencq who replaced Rusinov for the last two races. Once again, it was a positive season for the team: Del Monte was second in the driver’s classification and GP Racing was third in the constructor’s title. In 2004, GP Racing confirmed its position at the top in Superfund Euro 3000 as well with Tor Graves joining Del Monte and Hodencq in a third car for the team. The title slipped out of Del Monte’s hands during the last race by one point only. The Italian had already conquered three wins, various podiums and was in the lead for 9 out of 10 races. An unfortunate collision with Graves at the start of the last round took the joy of winning the much deserved title away from Fabrizio and GP Racing. Hodencq scored 3 points on the way to 11th overall while Graves failed to score.

In 2005 GP Racing participated in the Italian F3000 Championship with the Lola BO2 driven by Fabrizio Del Monte and by the débuting Juan Caceres who ended the season 5th. Alex Lloyd and Toni Vilander also raced for the team later in the season after Del Monte left. GP Racing took 3rd in the teams championship. The team also participated in the LMES Championship with Promec (only one race in Monza).

In 2006, GP Racing linked-up with Gian Carlo Minardi to form the Minardi Team by GP Racing, which competed with good results in the new Euroseries 3000. Caceres stayed on with the team alongside Christiano Rocha though neither would complete the season. Despite having somewhat of a revolving door with no less than 6 drivers racing throughout the season, the team secured 2nd in the teams championship. Roldan Rodriguez, Diego Nunes, Davide Rigon and Fausto Ippoliti would complete the season while Rocha returned to the team in a third car. Rocha finished the season in 4th while Rodriguez and Caceras were 6th and 7th respectively.

Piquet Sports

Piquet Sports was founded in 2000 by Brazilian Nelson Piquet, a triple Formula One World Drivers' Champion, for his son Nelson Piquet Jr. with Filipe Vargas, the team manager, setting up the operation. The team's first competition was the South American Formula Three Championship where Piquet Jr. took second in his first race and won four races later in Cascavel. The young Brazilian finished 5th in the championship with 77 points, while Piquet Sports finished fourth in the team's championship, also scoring 77 points.

The team stuck with competing in the South American championship the following year, which they took a majority thirteen of a possible eighteen wins scoring a total of 296 points as Piquet Jr. and Piquet Sports took the Drivers' and Teams' titles respectively, with the Brazilian having a margin of over a hundred points from his nearest rival Danilo Dirani. The team's racing interest went across the Atlantic for 2003 as the team entered the British Formula 3 Championship. The team performed well in their début season, with Piquet Jr. taking six wins over the year with a further five podiums brought his points tally to 231 points, putting him third in the final standings for the Drivers' Championship behind Alan van der Merwe and Jamie Green.

The team's racing involvement was split in 2004 with the team entering Piquet Jr. for a second season in the British championship while bringing their attention back to the South American championship, entering fellow Brazilian Alexandre Sarnes Negrão. Both Piquet and Negrão took their respective championship crowns, taking a total of sixteen wins between them.

The team graduated into the newly formed GP2 series, which replaced Formula 3000 as the feeder series of Formula One. The team entered their two champions Piquet Jr. and Negrão for their debut season in the category. British team HiTech Racing formed an association with the team's GP2 activities but this was terminated midway through 2005. The team finished sixth in their debut season with Piquet scoring a single win at Spa-Francorchamps.

2006 saw Piquet produce their most competitive season to date, with the Piquet Jr. taking four wins and challenging Lewis Hamilton to that year's title. The Brazilian, however, lost out by twelve points to the Brit and the team also lost out to Hamilton's ART Grand Prix team in the Teams' Championship.

Piquet Jr. left the squad at the end of 2006 to join Renault Formula One team as the team's test driver.

Merger of GP Racing and Piquet Sports
Piquet Sports merged with GP Racing ahead of the 2007 season to create "Minardi by Piquet Sports". Spaniard Roldán Rodríguez was employed to replace Piquet Jr. The newly named team enjoyed little, if any, success in 2007 GP2 Series season with Negrão failing to take the mantle of team leader and only scored a single podium position. The team finished the year with 22 points and outside the top ten in the Teams' Championship. In the Euro Series 3000 GP Racing won both the drivers and teams championship both  with Davide Rigon and Diego Nunes completing a championship 1-2.

For 2008, the Minardi name was dropped from the team's title. 2008 saw the team gain some success, with Italian Marco Bonanomi taking a win in the newly formed Asia series and new signing Pastor Maldonado, winner of the previous season's race in Monaco, taking the team's first pole position in the series at the opening round in Catalunya.

2008 would be the team's final year in the Euro Series 3000. Fabio Onidi joined the team alongside the returning Roldan Rodriguez who shared the lead car with Pastor Maldonado and Fabrizio Crestani. Onidi just lost out on the drivers title by 2 points to Nicolas Prost while Crestani ended up 5th. The team also lost out to Bull Racing by 8 points in the battle for the teams championship.

For the 2009 season, the team was renamed Piquet GP and Rodriguez returned to the team alongside Durango exponent Alberto Valerio.

Controversies
During their existence so far in motor racing, Piquet Sports have been involved some controversies over the years, most notably in 2002 when Piquet Jr. won that year's title. A number of teams protested at the team for "illegal testing" over the course of the season, Piquet Sports argued that the newly installed mudflaps on the Dallara made it a "prototype" model – the team escaped punishment.

Results

GP2 Series

 D.C. = Drivers' Championship position, T.C. = Teams' Championship position.

GP2 Series 
(key) (Races in bold indicate pole position) (Races in italics indicate fastest lap)

Euroseries 3000

 D.C. = Drivers' Championship position, T.C. = Teams' Championship position.

Notes and references

See also
 Rapax Team

External links
 Team Minardi Piquet
 GP Racing

Italian auto racing teams
GP2 Series teams
British Formula Three teams
Auto racing teams established in 1997
Auto racing teams disestablished in 2009
1997 establishments in Italy
2009 disestablishments in Italy
Auto GP teams
Piquet GP
International Formula 3000 teams
FIA Sportscar Championship entrants
Formula Renault teams
Auto racing teams established in 2000
Brazilian auto racing teams